VH1: Storytellers is a live album by Meat Loaf.  Meat Loaf told humorous stories of his career as a singer and how he unfolded into rock stardom. The DVD version has two additional songs. Some songs on the CD are taken from Meat Loaf's Hard Rock Live performance (also for VH1). Others were taken from the pre-show soundcheck. The album peaked at No. 129 on the Billboard 200, making it his lowest charting album in the United States.

The show was to have been Meat and Jim Steinman together. However, due to Jim falling ill, Meat had to do the show alone. This worried the producers, as Storytellers is about the concept of each song that an artist wrote that they were about to perform, and Meat did not write his own songs. To counter this, according to the liner notes of the CD, Meat improvised several things, such as the actions on the Radio Broadcast portion of Paradise by the Dashboard Light. For the stories, he instead goes into detail about how the hit album Bat Out of Hell was conceived, with each song preceded by him discussing how the song fit into the making of the album and the difficulties that came into making, producing, and publishing the album. Meat also pitched a solution to how to get around the length of the songs: break up songs into two television segments, with stopping the song for a commercial, then finishing the song once they returned.

Track listing
"All Revved Up with No Place to Go"
"Life Is a Lemon and I Want My Money Back" – Hard Rock Live version
"Story" (Audience Member talks to Meat)
"You Took the Words Right Out of My Mouth (Hot Summer Night)"
"Story" (Meat answers "What is 'That'?" when talking about I'd Do Anything for Love)
"I'd Do Anything for Love (But I Won't Do That)" – Hard Rock Live version
"Lawyers, Guns and Money" – Hard Rock Live version
"Story" (How Meat met Jim Steinman)
"More Than You Deserve"
"Story" (Meat discussing pitching an album, which would become Bat Out of Hell)
"Heaven Can Wait" – Soundcheck before the show
"Story" (Meat discusses the difficulties of demoing Bat, getting a record deal, and how long Steinman's songs were before being published)
"Paradise by the Dashboard Light"
"Story" (How Meat hates going on television, and what song "broke" Bat)
"Two Out of Three Ain't Bad" – Hard Rock Live version
"Story" (What the title song of Bat was written for)
"Bat Out of Hell" – Soundcheck before the show
"Is Nothing Sacred" – Bonus Track feat. Patti Russo

DVD exclusive tracks
"Two Out of Three Ain't Bad" – Alternate version
"I'd Do Anything for Love (But I Won't Do That)" – Alternate version
"Heaven Can Wait" – Alternate version
"Bat Out of Hell" – Alternate version
"A Kiss Is a Terrible Thing to Waste"
"Rock and Roll Dreams Come Through"

Personnel
 Meat Loaf – lead vocals, guitar
 Patti Russo – female lead vocals
 Damon La Scot – lead guitar
 Ray Anderson – rhythm guitar, keyboards, vocals
 Kasim Sulton – bass guitar, acoustic guitar, vocals, musical director
 Tom Brislin – piano, vocals
 John Miceli – drums
 Pearl Aday – backing vocals

Charts

Certifications

References

Meat Loaf albums
1999 live albums
1999 video albums
Live video albums
VH1 Storytellers